Plasma processing is a plasma-based material processing technology that aims at modifying the chemical and physical properties of a surface.

Plasma processing techniques include:
Plasma activation
Plasma ashing
Plasma cleaning
Plasma electrolytic oxidation
Plasma etching
Plasma functionalization
Plasma polymerization
Corona treatment
Plasma modification

Related topics are plasma chemistry, chemical vapor deposition, and physical vapor deposition processes like sputter deposition, plasma iondoping, vacuum plasmaspraying, and reactive ion etching.

See also
List of plasma (physics) applications articles

References